The Sunward STB is a Chinese amphibious ultralight trike, designed and produced by Sunward Tech (Hunan Sunward Science & Technologies Company Limited) of Zhuzhou. The aircraft is supplied complete and ready-to-fly.

Design and development
The STB is intended for the search and rescue role, as well as tourist flights and recreational use.

The aircraft design features a strut-braced hang glider-style high-wing, weight-shift controls, a two-seats-in-tandem open cockpit with a rigid boat hull, retractable tricycle landing gear and a single engine in pusher configuration. The boat hull was designed for use in higher wave conditions.

The aircraft is made from bolted-together aluminum tubing and composites. It uses a double surface Grif Hazard wing, made by the Italian company Grif Italia. The  span wing is supported by struts and uses an "A" frame weight-shift control bar. The powerplant is an Austrian-made twin cylinder, liquid-cooled, two-stroke, dual-ignition  Rotax 582 engine or four cylinder, air and liquid-cooled, four-stroke, dual-ignition  Rotax 912UL engine.

Variants
STB582
Model with a  Rotax 582 engine.
STB912
Model with a  Rotax 912UL engine.

Specifications (STB582)

See also
Sunward ST

References

External links
Official website

STB
2010s Chinese sport aircraft
2010s Chinese ultralight aircraft
Single-engined pusher aircraft
Ultralight trikes